The Third Half is a Macedonian-Czech-Serbian film that deals with Macedonian football during World War II, and the deportation of Jews from Macedonia. It is a story of love during wartime and a country's passion for soccer. The government of Macedonia considered the film of national interest and funded it with one million euros. The Third Half was selected as the Macedonian entry for Best Foreign Language at the 85th Academy Awards.

Plot

The film is set in what is today North Macedonia, then part of the Vardar Banovina, a province in Kingdom Yugoslavia, and follows the period shortly after the Tripartite Pact invasion of the region.

The film begins with 2012, on the 70th anniversary of the Nazi Invasion of Yugoslavia. An old lady watches the opening of the Holocaust Memorial Center in Skopje, Macedonia. She shows the city to her American granddaughter, Rachel, and tells her the story of when she was a young girl, while walking in Skopje's Old Bazaar.

The next scene, it's 1941, Skopje and FC Macedonia are about to play a football game against one of Serbia's best football teams, Srpski Mac. FC Macedonia's owner, Dimitrija (Mitko S. Apostolovski) talks to the team before the match, trying to motivate them by saying that the name 'Macedonia' is a sacred name. This does little, as the team is unprepared, and they lose to the Serbians. After the match, on the team lunch, Dimitrija tells the players that a new coach is about to arrive to train them, the legendary German-Jewish player Rudolph Spitz (Richard Sammel). The players are sceptical but they go with it.

Meanwhile, player from the team, Kosta (Sasko Kocev), meets a wealthy young Jewish woman, Rebecca (Katarina Ivanovska). They start to develop chemistry, but her father strongly opposes her, saying that 'Each bird should be with her own flock'. Nevertheless, Kosta invites her to one of his matches.

Rudolph Spitz, having arrived from Prussia, starts to rigorously train the team, explaining his footballing philosophy. The players however do not take him seriously and talk about other things while in training. At the next match, against Hajduk Split, Rebecca shows up at the stadium, after not going on a previously arranged date with Kosta because her father locked her in the house. Kosta, visibly angry, uses that to his advantage by scoring a goal, but the team loses to the better prepared Croats. Demotivated and frustrated that they can't win even with a good and famous coach, the players start to doubt themselves. Spitz sees this and takes them on the Skopje train station for their next training session. He tells them to clean the closets to develop a sense of perfection, and that it's not the goal which is important, but the quest towards it.

On March 25, 1941, Yugoslavia joins the Tripartite Pact, which greatly worries Rebecca's father, Don Rafael Cohen (Rade Sherbedzija). Meanwhile, Rebecca is at the Ohrid Lake with her choir. There, she sees Kosta sending messages in bottles in a secluded part of the lake. He tells her that he came to say goodbye as the team is travelling to Belgrade to play Srpski Mac, asking for an encouragement to fight. They make love in the lake.

Two days later, with the overthrowing of the Yugoslav government, Yugoslavia switches sides against the Axis Powers. Local barber hears on the radio that FC Macedonia has beaten Srpski Mac in Belgrade and quickly spreads the news around the Old Bazaar after telling Rebecca personally. The team is welcomed at the station, with the majority of the people managing to sing louder than the local Serbian leaders. Rebecca meets Kosta at the train station with her suitcase and moves in with Kosta in the locker room of the stadium.

Two weeks later, on April 6, 1941, the Nazis invade Yugoslavia. Bulgarian Colonel Garvanoff comes to greet the team on behalf of the new Bulgarian puppet government. He tells them that the only thing missing from the crown of King Boris is Macedonia itself, and proceeds to hang a yellow star on the coat of Rudolph Spitz. The players express their support for Spitz, even though he is German. At the next match, Garvanoff visits the locker room, and finds Rebecca cleaning the floor. Dimitrija comes and tells him that she is his niece. Garvanoff approaches Spitz on the sideline, telling him that the only reason he is allowed on the stadium is because he wants everyone to see him defeated, and that from the next game, he is not allowed to any public gathering. FC Macedonia wins, but the Bulgarian newspapers write nothing about it.

The next day, several players of the team see Bulgarian authorities executing several Gypsies on the street, which greatly disgusts them. Dimitrija explains to them that this is war, and there's nothing they can do about it, so they have to accept it. On the next match, during the intonation of the national anthem, with everyone in the stadium doing the Nazi salute, the goalkeeper Afrika, instead does a disrespectful sign with his hand. Dimitrija argues that his finger was broken, but Garvanoff has him heavily beaten up. Meanwhile, while laying together, Rebecca tells Kosta that she is pregnant. Spitz goes to pray to the local synagogue but the rabbi tells him that the synagogue is closed and turned into a stable for horses.

Garvanoff has lunch with Dimitrija, revealing that he originates from Macedonia and that his grandfather was a komita, and after the failed Ilinden Uprising he ran away to Bulgaria, and that he is proud that he is returning home as a liberator. He tells Dimitrija that he can open his own newspaper, as a sign of gratitude for aiding the Bulgarian cause. He then proceeds to give him a telegram from the Bulgarian Ministry of Sport, saying that they have no place being national champions, indirectly telling him that they must lose the upcoming final against Levski Sofia because his career depended on it. On the day before the match, Spitz gives a final team talk, telling the team that even though they are up against a giant, the true greatness of a man isn't his size, but his heart and mind. Meanwhile, in the hospital, Dimitrija talks to his mother, telling her that he cannot imagine the world under Nazi rule, but also that it's too late to change sides now. The nurse comes and tells him that she can't listen to him.

On the day of the match, with the whole town watching and listening, Spitz is outside of the stadium. He speaks to himself, seemingly directing the way in which FC Macedonia plays. Several fouls are made by the Levski players, but the referee doesn't give any of them. The crowd stars to show anger. FC Macedonia scores but the goal is annulled. Shortly after, Levski scores. At the half time, Dimitrija comes to the players' locker room and hangs a horseshoe inside. Spitz continues speaking outside of the stadium, dancing as he draws every play FC Macedonia does. Kosta scores for 1-1. Shortly thereafter, Pancho (Toni Mihajlovski), furiously reacts, receiving a red card and giving away a penalty. Afrika, however, easily saves it. After that, Kosta calls the team, telling them how to play the final minute. The team listens to him, and they score in the final second, winning the game 2-1, sending the crowd in a delirium. After the match, Spitz tells the team that he has travelled in a lot of countries, but he can only call this one his home. The team salute him.

The following day, the deportation of the Macedonian Jews begin, including Rebecca's father and their servant. Garvanoff calls Dimitrija, telling him that the barbarians do not have vision of racial unity, dreams of a better society, and that what they're doing in Skopje today cannot be fathomed by a primitive mind. He then proceeds to give him a gun and ask him to pick a side. In the stadium locker room, Kosta comes to find Rebecca wearing a yellow star, preparing water for her father and family. Kosta tells her that its dangerous that she goes out there, and bring the water to her father himself. Her father, aware that he is not coming back home, gives him the pictures of his family saying that it is all that is left to him in his life. He tells Kosta to take care of himself.

The following day, Dimitrija, Spitz and a Bulgarian guard, travel to a nearby hill above Skopje. On the radio, they hear that the result from the match is annulled and that Levski Sofia is the champion. While walking to a cliff, Spitz tells the story of how he started playing football. Dimitrija, facing him at gunpoint, instead shoots the guard. He tells Spitz that he should run towards Italy, because Italians don't persecute Jews, and that he will be safe there. Spitz runs away, leaving Dimitrija to commit suicide.

Colonel Garvanoff comes to the locker room, telling the team that a German regiment from Stalingrad is being transferred to the hospital in Skopje. They wanted to play a friendly with FC Macedonia, and that they must win. Kosta tells the team that his daughter was born today and that he finally knows what he wants to do in life, that he wants Hannah to live. FC Macedonia doesn't show up to the friendly match, leaving Garvanoff surprised. They all took up arms and went into the mountains as partisans.

The film pans back to 2012 with Rachel asking the old lady, now revealed to be Rebecca if they ever played a football match again. Rebecca, tells her that only a handful of them returned from the war. After that they moved to Israel and then to America, settled in the new life, and never returned to Macedonia. Rachel asks her why did she return now. They both enter the Memorial Center, with Rebecca approaching one of the urns containing the ashes of the dead Jews from Skopje. She greets her father, showing him a picture of her extended family, a fruit of her betrayal. She continues, telling him that she is proof that a woman can also score goals, and that she had won her game.

Background
The Third Half depicts the history of 7,148 Macedonian Jews who were deported to the gas chambers of Treblinka by the Bulgarian administrative and military authorities, who were cooperating with the Nazi regime. In February 1943, Bulgaria and Germany signed an agreement stipulating the deportation of Bulgarian Jews to camps in Poland. In March 1943, Bulgarian police rounded up the Jews of Thrace and Macedonia at night and placed them in detention camps under extremely harsh conditions. Their property and their houses were confiscated prior to their deportation in late March. Sealed trains transported 11,384 Jews, mainly via the Danube River, to death camps, from which almost none returned. The film was inspired by the true story of the FC Macedonia football team. The film is based also on an interview to the Shoah Foundation on that story given in 1998 by Neta Koen (current name Marija Mladenovska) a Macedonian Holocaust survivor. The Jewish coach of FC Macedonia Illés Spitz who is also a Macedonian Holocaust survivor was rescued by the Bulgarian club's managers.

Cast
Sasko Kocev as Kosta
Katarina Ivanovska as Rebecca Cohen
Bedija Begovska as Rebecca in 2012
Richard Sammel as Rudolph Spitz, a Prussian footballer-turned-coach hired to coach FC Macedonia
Rade Šerbedžija as Don Rafael Cohen, a wealthy Jewish banker and Rebecca's father
Emil Ruben as Garvanov, a Bulgarian colonel
Mitko S. Apostolovski as Dimitrija, the owner of FC Macedonia
Toni Mihajlovski as Pancho
Igor Angelov as Afrika
Gorast Cvetkovski as Skeptic
Oliver Mitkovski as Jordan
Igor Stojchevski as Cezar
Dimitrija Doksevski as Gengys
Bajram Severdzan as Choro
Whitney Montgomery as Rachel, Rebecca's granddaughter
Zvezda Angelovska as Blagunja, Pancho's wife
Verica Nedeska as Zamila, Rebecca's friend
Petre Arsovski as Papas, Dimitrija's friend
Meto Jovanovski as a rabbi
Salaetin Bilal as a shoemaker
Petar Mircevski as a barber

Production
The film was directed by Darko Mitrevski and supported by the Macedonian Film Fund, the Holocaust Fund of the Jews from Macedonia, The Jewish Community of Macedonia and the Czech State Fund. It was declared a film of a national interest by the Macedonian Government. The film was shot in Skopje, Bitola and Ohrid. Filming took place between September 10 and October 27, 2011.

Reception
Writing for Cineuropa, Vladan Petković stated that The Third Half was the most ambitious Macedonian film since Before the Rain (1994). He went on to praise the setting, lauding the director for managing to "put together all the complicated details of the period and the geopolitical situation". Petković highlighted Sammel's acting as the strongest and dubbed it "the real emotional anchor of the film".

The film was selected as the Macedonian entry for the Best Foreign Language Oscar at the 85th Academy Awards, but it did not make the final cut for nomination.

Controversy

Evgeni Kirilov, Andrey Kovatchev and Stanimir Ilchev—Bulgarian members of the European Parliament—expressed outrage over the film and called upon European Commissioner for Enlargement Štefan Füle to reprove the Republic of Macedonia over the film. They claimed the film was an "attempt to manipulate Balkan history" and "spread hate" on the part of the Republic of Macedonia against its neighbours. The director of the film denied the accusations; he and the film crew described the objections to the film as an example of Holocaust denial.

In late November 2011, the Macedonian media alleged that Member of the European Parliament Doris Pack, of Germany, dismissed the Bulgarian politicians' criticism of the film. Subsequently, in an extraordinary meeting of the EU Committee on Foreign Affairs attended by the Foreign Minister of the Republic of Macedonia, Doris Pack denied this allegation.

In a 2021 documentary called The Last Half, the Bulgarian director Stepan Polyakov has argued that the screenplay of the film The Third Half differs significantly from the real events Mitrevski claims to reflect, and it even openly manipulates them.

See also
 The Holocaust in Bulgaria
 List of submissions to the 85th Academy Awards for Best Foreign Language Film
 List of Macedonian submissions for the Academy Award for Best Foreign Language Film

Notes

References

External links 
 
 
 Darko Mitrevski website
 Euronews on The Third Half
 The Holocaust in Macedonia (source: United States Holocaust Memorial Museum)
 The deportation of the Macedonian Jews to Treblinka (source: Yad Vashem)
 Empty Boxcars (2011) Documentary  * at IMDb  link Vimeo

2012 films
Macedonian-language films
2010s Bulgarian-language films
2010s German-language films
English-language Macedonian films
Judaeo-Spanish-language films
Films about Jews and Judaism
Films based on biographies
Association football films
Holocaust films
Films set in North Macedonia
Anti-Bulgarian sentiment
2010s sports films
Propaganda in North Macedonia
2012 multilingual films
Macedonian multilingual films